Newroz or Nawroz is the Kurdish celebration of Nowruz; the arrival of spring and new year in Kurdish culture. The lighting of the fires at the beginning of the evening of March 20 is the main symbol of Newroz among the Kurds.

In Zoroastrianism, fire is a symbol of light, goodness and purification. Angra Mainyu, the demonic anti-thesis of Ahura Mazda, was defied by Zoroastrians with a big fire every year, which symbolized their defiance of and hatred for evil and the arch-demon. In Kurdish legend, the holiday celebrates the deliverance of the Kurds from a tyrant, and it is seen as another way of demonstrating support for the Kurdish cause. The celebration coincides with the March equinox which usually falls on 21 March and is usually held between 18 and 24 March. The festival has an important place in terms of Kurdish identity for the majority of Kurds. Though celebrations vary, people generally gather together to welcome the coming of spring; they wear traditional coloured Kurdish clothes, dance together, light fires to dance around and jump over the bonfire, play Kurdish games.

Mythology

The arrival of spring has been celebrated in Asia Minor since neolithic times. The root of this story goes back to ancient Iranian legends, retold in General History by scientist Dinawari, The Meadows of Gold by Muslim historian Masudi, the Shahnameh, a poetic opus written by the Persian poet Ferdowsi around 1000 AD, and the Sharafnameh by the medieval Kurdish historian Sherefxan Bidlisi.

Zahak, who is named Zuhak by the Kurds, was an evil Assyrian king who conquered Iran and had serpents growing from his shoulders. Zahak's rule lasted for one thousand years; his evil reign caused spring to no longer come to Kurdistan. During this time, two young men were sacrificed daily and their brains were offered to Zahak's serpents in order to alleviate his pain. However, the man who was in charge of sacrificing the two young men every day would instead kill only one man a day and mix his brains with those of a sheep in order to save the other man. As discontent grew against Zahak's rule, the nobleman Fereydun planned a revolt. The revolt was led by Kaveh (also known as Kawa) (in the Ossetian language, Kurdalægon), a blacksmith who had lost six sons to Zahak. The young men who had been saved from the fate of being sacrificed (who according to the legend were ancestors of the Kurds) were trained by Kaveh into an army that marched to Zahak's castle where Kaveh killed the king with a hammer. Kaveh is said to have then set fire to the hillsides to celebrate the victory and summon his supporters; spring returned to Kurdistan the next day.

March 20 is traditionally marked as the day that Kaveh defeated Zahak. This legend is now used by the Kurds to remind themselves that they are a different, strong people, and the lighting of the fires has since become a symbol of freedom. It is a tradition to jump across a fire at Newroz.

According to Evliya Çelebi, the district (sancak) of Merkawe in Shahrazur in the southeastern part of Iraqi Kurdistan is named after Kaveh. The 12th century geographer Yaqoot Hamawi mentions Zor (Zur), son of Zahhak (Aji Dahak), as founder of the famous city of Sharazor.

In the 1930s, the Kurdish poet Taufik Abdullah, wanting to instill a new Kurdish cultural revival, used a previously known, modified version of the story of Kawa. He connected the myths where people felt oppressed with Newroz, thus reviving a dying holiday and making it a symbol of the Kurdish national struggle.

Newroz customs and celebration
Newroz is considered the most important festival in Kurdish culture, and is a time for entertainment such as games, dancing, family gathering, preparation of special foods and the reading of poetry.  The celebration of Newroz has its local peculiarities in different regions of Kurdistan.  On the eve of Newroz, in southern and eastern Kurdistan, bonfires are lit.  These fires symbolize the passing of the dark season, winter, and the arrival of spring, the season of light. The 17th century Kurdish poet Ahmad Khani mentions in one of his poems how the people, youth and elderly,  leave their houses and gather in countryside to celebrate Newroz. 

Armenian scholar Mardiros Ananikian  emphasizes the identical nature of Newroz and the Armenian traditional New Year, Navasard, noting that it was only in the 11th century that Navasard came to be celebrated in late summer rather than in early spring. He states that the Newroz – Navasard “was an agricultural celebration connected with commemoration of the dead […] and aiming at the increase of the rain and the harvests.”1 The great center of Armenian Navasard, Ananikian points out, was Bagavan, the center of fire worship.

Political overtones

The Kurdish association with Newroz has become increasingly pronounced since the 1950s when the Kurds in the Middle East and those in the diaspora in Europe started adopting it as a tradition. Following the persecution of any Kurdish expression in Turkey, the revival of the Newroz celebration has become more intense and politicized and has also become a symbol of the Kurdish resurrection. By the end of the 1980s, Newroz was mainly associated "with the attempts to express and resurrect" the Kurdish identity. 

In 1991, the Turkish minister of Culture Namık Kemal Zeybek gave out the directive to hold the Nevruz holiday. During the leadership of Prime Minister Suleyman Demirel Turkey legalized the celebration of Nevruz, spelling it "Nevruz" and claiming its origins were to be found in Central Asia. The Government was attempting to counter the rising Kurdish nationalism. Using the Kurdish spelling "Newroz" has been officially forbidden, though it is still widely used by Kurds. Several Turkish newspapers were prosecuted for the spelling of Newroz. In the Kurdish regions of Turkey, specifically in Eastern Anatolia but also in Istanbul and Ankara where there are large Kurdish populations, people gather and jump over bonfires.  Previous to it being legalized, the PKK, the Kurdistan Workers’ Party, had chosen the date of the Newroz festival to stage attacks to obtain publicity for their cause; this led to Turkish forces detaining thousands of people who were seen as supporters of the Kurdish rebel movements. During the Newroz celebrations of 1992, more than 90 Kurdish participants were killed by the Turkish government. In 2008, two participants were killed.

In Syria, the Kurds dress up in their national dress and celebrate the new year. According to Human Rights Watch, Syrian Kurds have had to struggle to celebrate Newroz, and in the past the celebration has led to violent oppression, leading to several deaths and mass arrests. The government has stated that the Newroz celebrations will be tolerated as long as they do not become political demonstrations of the treatment of the Kurds. During the Newroz celebrations in 2008, three Kurds were shot dead by Syrian security forces.

Kurds in the diaspora also celebrate the new year: Kurds in Australia celebrate Newroz not only as the beginning of the new year but also as Kurdish National Day; the Kurds in Finland celebrate the new year as a way of demonstrating their support for the Kurdish cause.  In London, organizers estimated that 25,000 people celebrated Newroz in March 2006.

Newroz in Kurdish literature
Newroz has been mentioned in works of many Kurdish poets and writers as well as musicians. One of the earliest records of Newroz in Kurdish literature is from Melayê Cizîrî (1570–1640):

The famous Kurdish writer and poet Piramerd (1867–1950) writes in his 1948 poem Newroz:

Gallery

See also
Yazidi New Year
Yaldā Night

References

Kurdish culture
Nowruz
Traditions involving fire